Alperay Demirciler (born 1 February 1993) is a Turkish volleyball player. He is a member of  Develi Belediyespor (men volleyball team) 
Demirciler plays for the Turkey men's junior national team and Turkey national team. He took part also in the boys' youth national team.

Career
Demirciler received his primary and middle school education at Turkish-Swedish Friendship School in Esenler, Istanbul. He finished later the TVF Fine Arts and Sports High School in Ankara.

He won the gold medal with the boys' youth national team at the 2011 European Youth Olympic Festival held in Trabzon, Turkey. At the 2012 Men's European Volleyball League, he took the silver medal with the Turkey national team.

Awards

Individual
2013 FIVB Volleyball Men's U21 World Championship "Best Libero"

National team
2011 European Youth Olympic Festival -  Gold Medal
2012 Men's European Volleyball League -  Silver Medal

References

1993 births
Place of birth missing (living people)
Living people
Turkish men's volleyball players
Galatasaray S.K. (men's volleyball) players
Fenerbahçe volleyballers